Pin Cushion is a 2017 English-language film written and directed by Deborah Haywood, her feature film debut. Pin Cushion premiered as the opening film of International Critics' Week at the 74th Venice International Film Festival and was released in the United Kingdom on 13 July 2018.

Plot 
Mother Lyn and daughter Iona (a.k.a. Dafty One and Dafty Two) are excited to be starting a new life in a small Midlands town. Determined to make a success of things after a tricky start at a new school, the gawky Iona becomes ‘best friends’ with Keeley, Stacey and Chelsea. Used to having Iona to herself, Lyn feels left out and tries unsuccessfully to make her own friends starting with Belinda, her sour-faced neighbour. As much as Lyn and Iona pretend to each other that things are going well, Iona struggles with schoolmates who act more like 'frenemies' than friends, and Lyn is treated with varying degrees of indifference by neighbours and a supposed support group.

Cast 
 Lily Newmark as Iona
 Joanna Scanlan as Lyn
 Loris Scarpa as Daz
 Sacha Cordy-Nice as Keeley
 Bethany Antonia as Chelsea
 Saskia Paige-Martin as Stacie
 Sophia Tuckey as Peggy	
 John Henshaw as Percy	
 Lennon Bradley as Sam
 Aury Wayne as Sicko	
 Charles Francis as Dwayne
 Isy Suttie as Anne
 Jacob Lee as Jordan
 Chanel Cresswell as Belinda 
 Nadine Coyle as Air Hostess

Production 
Pin Cushion was filmed in Haywood's home town of Swadlincote, South Derbyshire, with locations including the interior of Gresley Old Hall in Church Gresley, the interior and exterior of The Pingle Academy, the exterior of the Town Hall, and in West Street to the High Street in the town centre, and a scene filmed in Burton Queen's Hospital. The house the main characters move into can be found in Hastings Road, Swadlincote.

Haywood chose to shoot part of the film at her old school because she "had such an awful time there. Before the film I used to close my eyes when I would drive past, now when I drive past I have great memories of making a film there." The graffiti written about her in the past had been painted over in the intervening years.

Reception 
Pin Cushion has received positive reviews from critics. On review aggregator Rotten Tomatoes, the film holds an approval rating of 89%, based on 36 reviews with an average rating of 7.1/10. The website's critical consensus reads, "Pin Cushion explores the prickly dynamics of mother-daughter relationships and female friendships, led by striking work from leads Lily Newmark and Joanna Scanlan." Metacritic gives the film a weighted average score of 74 out of 100, based on 8 critics, indicating "generally favorable reviews". The film was described by The Guardian as an "ecstasy of black comic misery and cartoon horror".

References

External links
 
 
 BFI: 10 Great Films About Troubled Mother-Daughter Relationships

2017 films
2017 drama films
Films shot in Derbyshire 
Films set in England
Films about bullying
Films about sexuality
Films scored by Natalie Holt
2010s English-language films